Hansawelle (Radio Bremen 1 – Hansawelle) was a German, public radio station owned and operated by Radio Bremen (RB) from 1946 until 30 April 2001.

References

Radio Bremen
Defunct radio stations in Germany
Radio stations established in 1946
Radio stations disestablished in 2001
1946 establishments in Germany
2001 disestablishments in Germany
Mass media in Bremen (city)